Marwin Reuvers (born 4 March 1999) is a Dutch footballer who plays as a midfielder for RBC Roosendaal.

Club career
Reuvers was at his home town club youth academy in Roosendaal before bankruptcy led to its closure. Instead he joined the youth set up at NAC Breda. He made his Eredivisie debut for Breda on 18 August, 2018 in a game against De Graafschap. On 7 June, 2021 he agreed to a move to a now re-established after bankruptcy RBC Roosendaal.

References

External links
 

Living people
1999 births
Sportspeople from Roosendaal
Association football midfielders
Dutch footballers
NAC Breda players
RBC Roosendaal players
Eredivisie players
Footballers from North Brabant